The collegia (plural of a collegium, "joined by law") were government departments in Imperial Russia, established in 1717 by Peter the Great. They were housed in the Twelve Collegia building in Saint Petersburg.

The reasons for establishing the colleges
In 1718-19, the liquidation of the former state bodies took place, replacing them with new ones, more suitable for young Peter the Great of Russia.

The Senate founding in 1711 served as a signal for the establishing of the sectoral management bodies - colleges. According to the plan of the Peter the Great, they had to replace the awkward system of prikaz and bring two innovations into the administration:
 The systematic separation of departments (orders often substituted each other, performing the same function that caused chaos in management. Moreover, some other functions were not at all covered by any clerical proceedings).
 Advisory procedure for solving the cases.
The form of the new central government was borrowed from Sweden and in Germany. The Sweden legislation became the basis for the development of the regulations for the legislation.

Evolution of the college system
Already in 1712, an attempt was made to establish a trading board with the participation of foreigners. In Germany and other European countries, experienced lawyers and officials were recruited to work in Russian state institutions. The Swedish boards were considered the best in Europe, and they were taken as a model.

The college system, however, began to take shape only by the end of 1717. “Breaking” the order system overnight turned out to be difficult, so the one-time abolition had to be abandoned. Orders were either absorbed by the colleges, or subordinated to them (for example, seven orders were included in the Justice Board).

Originally nine were established:
Collegium of Commerce
Collegium of Financial Inspection and Control
Collegium of Foreign Affairs
Collegium of Justice
Collegium of Manufacturing
Collegium of the Navy
Collegium of State Expenses
Collegium of State Income
Collegium of War

Three more were later added:
Collegium of Estates
Collegium of Mining
Collegium of Town Organization

Each collegium consisted of a president, a vice-president, four councilors, four assessors, a procurator, a secretary, and a chancellery. The collegia were replaced with ministries during the Government reform of Alexander I.

In 1720, the Chief Magistrate was established (having the rights of the board). This body coordinated the work of all magistrates and being for them the Court of Appeal.

Around 1720, the Justice college  of Livland and Estland Affairs was established, from 1762 it was named the Justice college of Livonia, Estland and Finland Affairs, which dealt with administrative and judicial issues of the affiliated Swedish provinces, as well as the activities of Protestant churches on the empire territory.

In 1721, the Collegium of Estates was established, replacing the Local Order.

In 1722, the Berg-Manufacture college was divided into the Berg board and the Collegium of Manufacturing, and the Collegium of Little Russia (1722–27) board was established, replacing the Little Russia Office.

In 1726, the College of Savings was established.

In 1763, the Medical College was established.

Because of the reform of local government carried out by Catherine the Great, by the mid-1780s the number of colleges sharply decreased. The redistributing of powers between central and local governments, and with the need to save the state funds, led to the fact that the colleges functions of local significance were transferred to the provincial institutions, and the functions of national importance to the Governing Senate. The colleges that continued to operate were only the Admiralty, Military, Foreign Affairs, Medical and Justice Board of Livonia, Estonia and Finland.

Some of the old colleges were restored for a while during the transformations done by Paul I of Russia, but during this period, the college management principle increasingly complied with the command unity principle in the framework of the project of establishing a ministerial system developed by the emperor. In particular, the Minister of Commerce headed the restored Commerce College. The college management took place by 1802, when the “Manifesto on the Establishment of Ministries” laid the foundation for a more progressive, ministerial system.

General Regulations
The colleges activity was determined by the General Regulations approved by Peter I on February 28 (March 10), 1720 (lost its value with the publication of the Digest of Laws of the Russian Empire).

The full title of this regulation is: “The General Regulations or the Charter, according to which state colleges, as well as all the chancelleries and offices belonging to them, are servants, not only in external and internal institutions, but also in the administration of their rank, they have a subtle approach”.

The General Regulations introduced an office administration called the “collegiate” after the name of the new type of institutions - colleges. The collegial way of making decisions by the presence of the collegium was dominant in these institutions. Peter I drew special attention to this form of decision-making, noting, “all the best dispensation through councils happens” (Chapter 2 of the General Regulations “On the advantage of colleges”).

Colleges Activity
The Senate has appointed the presidents and the vice-presidents of the colleges (when appointing the president, the opinion of the tsar was taken into account). In addition to them, the new bodies included four advisers, four assessor (assessors), secretary, actuary (chancellery servant, who registered acts or their components), a registrar, a translator, clerks.

The President was the first person in the college, but he could not decide anything without the consent of the members of the college. Vice-President replaced the President during his absence; usually helped him to carry out the tasks of a chairperson of the board. In 1718–1722, the presidents of the collegiums were part of the Senate, but then, only the presidents of the three most important collegiums (Foreign, Military, and Admiralty), and (temporarily) the President of the Berg College, participated at the meetings.

The meetings of the collegiums were held daily, except Sunday and holidays. They began at 6 or 8 am, depending on the time of year, and lasted 5 hours.

Materials for the colleges were prepared in the Office of the collegium, from where they were transferred to the General Presence of the Collegium, where they were discussed and adopted by the majority of votes. Issues on which the college failed to make a decision were transferred to Senate - the only institution to which the colleges were subordinate.

At each college, there was a prosecutor, whose duty was to observe the correct and powerless solution of cases and the execution of decrees both by the college and by its subordinate structures.

The secretary becomes the central figure of the office. The secretary was responsible for the collegium office operation: preparing cases for the hearing, reporting cases at the collegium meeting, conducting reference work on cases, making decisions and monitor their execution, keeping the seal of the collegium.

The value of boards
The established collegium system completed the process of centralization and bureaucratization of the state apparatus. A clear distribution of departmental functions, uniform standards of activity (according to the General Regulations) - all this significantly distinguished the new apparatus from the mandate system.

In addition, the creation of colleges system of regionalism, which struck the last blow to the mestnichestvo system that was abolished in the early 1682, but which took place informally.

Colleges’ operation drawbacks 
The grandiose plan of Peter I to define the departmental functions and to give each official a clear plan of action was not fully implemented. Often colleges replaced each other (as once orders). Therefore, for example, Berg-, Manufactura- and Commerce-colleges could perform the same function.

For a long time, outside the sphere of control of the collegiums, the most important functions remained — police, lumières, medicine, and the post offices. Gradually, however, new branch bodies, often called chancelleries, supplemented the collegium system. Thus, the Pharmaceutical Order, which was already operating in the new capital, St. Petersburg, was transformed into the Medical College since 1721, and since 1725 into the Medical Chancellery. Colleges’ chancelleries could be both single-minded and collegial. Collective chancelleries did not have such a rigid and precise regulation as collegiums, but approached to them by structure and tasks.

See also
Prikaz

1717 establishments in Russia
Government of the Russian Empire
Government reform of Peter the Great